Hopetoun Airport  is an airport in Hopetoun, Victoria, Australia. Currently, no scheduled passenger services operate at the airport.

See also
 List of airports in Victoria

References

Airports in Victoria (Australia)